This is the complete list of women's Olympic medalists in swimming.

Current program

50 metre freestyle

100 metre freestyle

200 metre freestyle

400 metre freestyle

800 metre freestyle

1500 metre freestyle

100 metre backstroke

200 metre backstroke

100 metre breaststroke

200 metre breaststroke

100 metre butterfly

200 metre butterfly

200 metre individual medley

400 metre individual medley

4 × 100 metre freestyle relay

Note: since 1992, swimmers who swam only in preliminary rounds also received medals.

4 × 200 metre freestyle relay

Note: swimmers who swam only in preliminary rounds also received medals.

4 × 100 metre medley relay

Note: since 1992, swimmers who swam only in preliminary rounds also received medals.

Mixed Events

4 × 100 metre medley relay

Open water

10 km marathon

Discontinued event

300 metre freestyle

All-time medal table 1912–2020

See also
 List of Olympic medalists in swimming (men)
 List of individual gold medalists in swimming at the Olympics and World Aquatics Championships (women)
 List of gold medalist relay teams in swimming at the Olympics and World Aquatics Championships
 List of top Olympic gold medalists in swimming
 Swimming at the Summer Olympics
 List of World Aquatics Championships medalists in swimming (women)
 List of Asian Games medalists in swimming

References
 International Olympic Committee results database
 Wallechinsky, David (2000). The complete book of the Summer Olympics – Sydney 2000 edition. New York: Overlook Press. .
HistoFINA Swimming Medallists And Statistics At Olympic Games, January 31, 2015

Swimming (women)
medalists
Olympic
Olympics (women)

Lists of female swimmers